The 1987–88 network television schedule for the four major English language commercial broadcast networks in the United States. The schedule covers primetime hours from September 1987 through August 1988. The schedule is followed by a list per network of returning series, new series, and series cancelled after the 1986–87 season.

Note: This is the first fall season for Fox, and the first year since 1958-59 that a fourth commercial television network (NTA) was broadcasting. Fox would air only two days a week until 1989.

PBS is not included; member stations have local flexibility over most of their schedules and broadcast times for network shows may vary.

New series are highlighted in bold.

All times are U.S. Eastern Time and Pacific Time (except for some live sports or events). Subtract one hour for Central, Mountain, Alaska and Hawaii-Aleutian times.

From February 13 to 28, 1988, all of ABC's primetime programming was preempted in favor of coverage of the 1988 Winter Olympics in Calgary.

Each of the 30 highest-rated shows is listed with its rank and rating as determined by Nielsen Media Research.

Legend

Sunday

 Note: The Wonder Years premiered January 31, 1988 after Super Bowl XXII.

Monday

Tuesday

Note: The Dictator was supposed to premiere March 15, 1988 at 8:30-9:00 on CBS, but My Sister Sam replaced it at the last minute due to the 1988 Writers Guild of America strike.

Wednesday

Note: Sara consisted entirely of reruns of the 1985 series.

Thursday

Friday

Note: Full House premiered Tuesday September 22, 1987 at 8:30 pm on ABC.

Saturday

By network

ABC

Returning Series
20/20
The ABC Sunday Night Movie
The Charmings
The Disney Sunday Movie
Dynasty
Growing Pains
Head of the Class
Hotel
MacGyver
Max Headroom
Mr. Belvedere +
Monday Night Baseball
Monday Night Football
Moonlighting
Ohara
Perfect Strangers
Sledge Hammer!
Spenser: For Hire
Who's the Boss?

New Series
Buck James
China Beach *
Dolly
Family Man *
Full House
HeartBeat *
Hooperman
Hothouse *
I Married Dora
Just in Time *
Just the Ten of Us *
Once a Hero
Probe *
Pursuit of Happiness
Sable
The "Slap" Maxwell Story
Supercarrier *
The Thorns *
The Wonder Years *
thirtysomething 

Not returning from 1986–87:
The Colbys
Dads
The Ellen Burstyn Show
Gung Ho
Harry
Heart of the City
Jack & Mike
Life with Lucy
Mariah
Our World
Sidekicks
Starman
Webster ^

An ^ indicates a show that came back in first-run syndication after a network cancellation.

CBS

Returning Series
60 Minutes
Cagney & Lacey
Candid Camera
The Cavanaughs +
CBS Summer Playhouse
CBS Sunday Movie
Dallas
Designing Women
The Equalizer
Falcon Crest
Houston Knights
Kate & Allie
Knots Landing
Magnum, P.I.
Murder, She Wrote
My Sister Sam
Newhart
Simon & Simon +
West 57th

New Series
48 Hours *
Beauty and the Beast
Blue Skies
Coming of Age *
Eisenhower and Lutz *
Everything's Relative
Frank's Place
High Mountain Rangers *
Jake and the Fatman
The Law & Harry McGraw
The Oldest Rookie
The Smothers Brothers Comedy Hour *
Tour of Duty
Trial and Error *
Wiseguy

Not returning from 1986–87:
Better Days
Downtown
Hard Copy
Kay O'Brien
The New Mike Hammer
Outlaws
The Popcorn Kid
Roxie
Scarecrow and Mrs. King
Shell Game
Spies
Take Five
Together We Stand/Nothing Is Easy
The Twilight Zone
The Wizard

Fox

Returning Series
21 Jump Street
Duet
It's Garry Shandling's Show
Married... with Children
Mr. President
The New Adventures of Beans Baxter
The Tracey Ullman Show
Werewolf

New Series
America's Most Wanted *
Dirty Dozen: The Series *
Family Double Dare *
Second Chance/Boys Will Be Boys
The Reporters
Women in Prison

Not returning from 1986–87:
Down and Out in Beverly Hills
Karen's Song

NBC

Returning Series
227
ALF
Amen
The Bronx Zoo +
Cheers
The Cosby Show
Crime Story
The Days and Nights of Molly Dodd +
The Facts of Life
Family Ties
The Golden Girls
Highway to Heaven
Hunter
L.A. Law
Matlock
Miami Vice
NBC Sunday Night Movie
NBC Monday Night at the Movies
Night Court
Our House
Rags to Riches
St. Elsewhere
Valerie's Family @

New Series
Aaron's Way *
Beverly Hills Buntz
Day by Day *
A Different World
George Schlatter's Funny People *
The Highwayman *
In the Heat of the Night *
J.J. Starbuck
Mama's Boy
My Two Dads
Private Eye
Sonny Spoon *
A Year in the Life

Not returning from 1986–87:
1986
The A-Team
Amazing Stories
Easy Street
Gimme a Break!
Hill Street Blues
Me & Mrs. C
Nothing in Common
Remington Steele
Roomies
Stingray
Sweet Surrender
The Tortellis
You Again?

Note: The * indicates that the program was introduced in midseason.

+ These shows returned as "backup" programming in midseason

@ Formerly Valerie.

References

United States primetime network television schedules
1987 in American television
1988 in American television